Zrkadlo rokov is the first compilation by the Modus band, released on OPUS Records in 1987.

Track listing

Official releases
 1987: Zrkadlo rokov, LP, MC, OPUS, #9113 1867

Credits and personnel

 Ján Lehotský - lead vocal, writer, keyboards
 Marika Gombitová - lead vocal, back vocal
 Miroslav Žbirka - lead vocal, chorus, guitar
 Ľuboš Stankovský - lead vocal
 Karol Morvay - lead vocal
 
 Miroslav Jevčák - lead vocal
 Kamil Peteraj - lyrics
 Boris Filan - lyrics
 Ján Lauko - producer

References

General

Specific

1987 compilation albums
Modus (band) compilation albums